WOHA is a Singaporean multinational architectural industrial design firm. First established in 1994 by Wong Mun Summ and Richard Hassell, its name is derived from the initial letters of the founders’ surnames. Based out of Singapore, the firm has built and designed dozens of projects throughout the Asia-Pacific, including residential towers, public housing estates, mass transit stations, hotels and cultural institutions.

Their work incorporates sustainable design strategies as a response to climate change and widespread urbanization.  They aim to integrate landscape, architecture and urbanism in high-rise buildings to improve quality of life for residents in high-density megacities.  Their buildings are notable for their extensive use of natural vegetation as a building element. 

In 2007, they came to international attention when the Moulmein Rise Residential Building in Singapore was awarded the Aga Khan Award for Architecture, establishing their reputation as designers of sustainable, naturally ventilated skyscrapers for an urban tropical context. In addition to architectural practice, WOHA have also taught at the National University of Singapore (NUS) and both Hassell and Wong have lectured at universities around the world.

History
In 1989, Wong graduated from the National University of Singapore and Hassell from the University of Western Australia. As students, both studied environmental design with an emphasis on passive design strategies and energy efficiency. Wong and Hassell met while employed at Kerry Hill Architects in Singapore before founding their own practice in 1994. WOHA’s practice begun with small projects and private houses. Following their success in the open competitions for two Mass Rapid Transit (MRT) stations in Singapore in 2000 (Bras Basah MRT station and Stadium MRT station) and the commission for the 1 Moulmein Rise condominium complex, the firm shifted its focus to public and commercial architecture.

According to the architects, a defining moment in the development of their design approach came with the entry for the Duxton Plain Public Housing International Competition held by Singapore’s Urban Redevelopment Authority in 2001. Although WOHA’s entry was not selected for construction, it was awarded the Merit Prize and provided them with an opportunity to experiment with design strategies for environmentally and socially sustainable high-density developments that would inform their later work.

WOHA subsequently completed a number of high-rise and large public buildings that were designed to be sustainable for tropical climates. These were open permeable buildings that encouraged natural ventilation to reduce reliance on mechanical cooling. They were also characterized by the extensive use of planting to cool the structure through transpiration.  It is an approach the architects have described as “breathing architecture”.

Examples include the Newton Suites condominium complex in Singapore, completed in 2007,  the Singapore School of the Arts and The Met residential tower in Bangkok, both completed in 2009.  The Met raised the international profile of the firm outside of South-East Asia, winning international awards such as the 2010 International Highrise Award and 2011 RIBA Lubetkin Award. The building was characterized as an example of sustainable high-density development for tropical megacities. The RIBA jury noted that the building offered an alternative to glazed skyscrapers common in temperate climates and made clear “that an alternative strategy to the sleek air-conditioned box can work in the tropics and has implications everywhere.”

WOHA have experimented with developing new types of green skyscraper. The Parkroyal on Pickering, completed in 2013, incorporates 15,000 square meters of elevated terraced gardens, which the architects refer to as “sky gardens”. The Oasia Hotel Downtown, completed in 2016, features a façade of aluminum mesh that supports 21 species of plants. The vertical landscaping of these structures is intended to reintroduce greenery to the built environment and encourage urban bio-diversity by attracting local birds and insects.

The SkyVille @ Dawson public housing estate, completed in 2015, provided the architects with an opportunity to realize many of their ideas about housing, which were first articulated with the Duxton Plains competition. According to the architects, SkyVille @ Dawson incorporates design strategies that are intended to promote community living. Communal terraces are provided every eleven stories in order to create groupings of 80 homes, referred to as “Sky Villages.” The building’s rooftop contains a publicly accessible park.

Kampung Admiralty, the firm's most recent public housing project, is an integrated development that houses apartments for seniors, a rooftop park and urban farm, a medical centre, child- and elder care, retail as well as food and beverage outlets under one roof. The project was named "World Building of the Year" at the 2018 World Architecture Festival.

The scale of WOHA’s built and proposed housing projects is intended to respond to the population growth of Asian cities. It is also an outcome of Singapore’s constrained geographic area. Wong has stated that the goal of WOHA’s architecture is to create “comfortable garden suburb experience and then replicate it vertically through a megastructure for everyone to enjoy.” WOHA present their high-density housing designs as replicable models for urban development. However, critics have questioned the universal applicability of this model outside of Singapore’s communitarian political system and coordinated urban planning program.

At the 2016 Venice Architecture Biennale, WOHA launched a book called Garden City Mega City, written in collaboration with Patrick Bingham-Hall. The book outlines WOHA’s design strategies in the context of the threats posed by global warming and the pace of Asian urbanization. WOHA currently have buildings under construction in Singapore, Indonesia, Australia, Bangladesh, India and China.

In August 2019, WOHA was picked by URA as the designer of Singapore's Pavilion for World Expo 2020 in Dubai. The team is tasked to create a green oasis on a 1,550 square-meter site in the Expo's Sustainability District.

In July 2020, a team led by WOHA was awarded the project to redevelop the Marina Bay floating platform, which will be renamed "NS Square" when completed in 2025.

Awards
 2020 World Expo Dubai, Architecture Best pavilions, Gold award for Singapore Pavilion.
 2018 World Architecture Festival, Building of the Year, Kampung Admiralty, Singapore
 2011 RIBA Lubetkin Prize – The Met
 2011 Australian Institute of Architects, Jørn 
 Utzon Award for International Architecture – School of the Arts, Singapore
 2011 Singapore President's Design Award, Design of the Year – School of the Arts, Singapore
 2010 The International Highrise Award – The Met
 2010 World Architecture Festival, World Holiday Building of the Year – Alila Villas Uluwatu
 2010 World Architecture Festival, World Learning Building of the Year – School of the Arts, Singapore
 2009 World Architecture Festival, World Transport Building of the Year – Bras Basah MRT station
 2009 World Architecture Festival, World Housing Development of the Year – The Met
 2007 Aga Khan Award for Architecture – 1 Moulmein Rise

Significant Built Works
 Sky Green, Taichung, Taiwan, 2015 - 2019
 Design Orchard, Singapore, 2017 - 2019
 Kampung Admiralty, Singapore, 2014 - 2017
 Parkroyal on Pickering, Singapore, 2010-2013
 School of the Arts, Singapore, 2005-2010
 Bugis+ (formerly known as iluma), Singapore, 2005-2009
 The Pano, Bangkok, Thailand, 2004-2009
 The Met, Bangkok, Thailand, 2003-2010
 Newton Suites, Singapore, 2003-2007
 Bras Basah MRT station, Singapore, 2000-2008
 Stadium MRT station, Singapore, 2000-2008
 Church of St Mary of the Angels, Singapore, 1999-2003

Further reading
 GARDEN CITY MEGA CITY: Rethinking Cities for the Age of Global Warming, Patrick Bingham-Hall, Pesaro Publishing, 2016, 
 WOHA Selected Projects: Selected Projects Vol. 2, Patrick Bingham-Hall, Pesaro Publishing, 2015, 
 WOHA Selected Projects: Selected Projects Vol. 1, Patrick Bingham-Hall, Pesaro Publishing, 2011, 
 WOHA: Breathing Architecture, Prestel Verlag, 2011, 
 WOHA: The Architecture of WOHA, Pesaro Publishing, 2009,

References

External links 

 WOHA
 WOHA on Archdaily
 WOHA on YouTube
 Media Facade Video
 Wong Mun Summ Lectures at World Architecture Festival 2013 in Singapore

 
Architecture firms of Singapore
Architecture in Singapore